The Málaga Public Library is a public library located in Málaga, Spain.

See also 
 List of libraries in Spain

References

External links 
 Málaga Public Library

Buildings and structures in Málaga
Libraries in Andalusia
Public libraries in Spain